Pikes Peak (formerly Pike's Peak) is the eponymic mountain in the Colorado Front Range of the Rocky Mountains

Pikes Peak may also refer to:

 Pike's Peak Forest Reserve, a Pike National Forest area
 Pike's Peak Gold Rush, an 1858-1861 gold rush
 Pike's Peak Country, the broad state region in the central Colorado Front Range to which "Fifty-Niner" miners trekked during the gold rush
  Pikes Peak Region, the local region near the mountain (Colorado Springs Metropolitan Statistical Area on the east side)
 Cultural Office of the Pikes Peak Region, an arts organization
 Mineralogy of the Pikes Peak Region
 Pikes Peak Center, a Colorado Springs facility serving the local region
 Pikes Peak State College, a college with campuses throughout the region
 Pikes Peak Derby Dames, the region's flat track roller derby team
  Pike's Peak Grange No. 163
  Pikes Peak Greenway	
 Pikes Peak Library District, the municipal library system
 Pikes Peak or Bust
 Pikes Peak or Bust Rodeo, the region's rodeo
  Pikes Peak Prep
  Pikes Peak Ringers
  Pikes Peak Writers Conference
  United States Army Pike's Peak Research Laboratory
 Various chapters of regional organizations, e.g., the Pikes Peak Council of the Boy Scouts of America, Pike's Peak Region Alumni Association of Sigma Chi, Pikes Peak chapter of Veterans Car Club of America, Public Relations Society of America Pikes Peak, American Red Cross Pikes Peak Chapter, Pikes Peak chapter of the National Space Society, etc.
  Pikes Peak granite, a geological formation found in the broad state region
 Pikes Peak Highway, a tollway to the summit
 Pikes Peak International Hill Climb, an annual time trial auto race on the highway
 Pikes Peak International Raceway, a former NASCAR auto speedway south of Colorado Springs
 Pikes Peak Marathon, an annual footrace from Manitou Springs on Barr Trail to the summit

Places beyond Colorado
 Pikes Peak (Iowa), a bluff rising 500 feet above the Mississippi River near the town of McGregor, Iowa
 Pikes Peak, Indiana, an unincorporated settlement
 Pikes Peak (Missouri)
 Pikes Peak Ocean to Ocean Highway		
 Pikes Peak State Park, a state park in Iowa

Other uses
 Pike's Peak (album), a 1962 album by vibraphonist Dave Pike
 Atchison and Pike's Peak Railroad
 Central Overland California and Pikes Peak Express Company